Shorea selanica is a species of plant in the family Dipterocarpaceae. It is a tree endemic to the Maluku Islands in Indonesia. It is a critically endangered species threatened by habitat loss.

References

selanica
Endemic flora of the Maluku Islands
Trees of the Maluku Islands
Critically endangered flora of Asia
Taxonomy articles created by Polbot